is a railway station on the Takayama Main Line in the city of Gero, Gifu Prefecture, Japan, operated by Central Japan Railway Company (JR Central).

Lines

Station layout
Yakeishi Station has two opposed ground-level side platforms connected by a footbridge. The station is unattended.

Platforms

Adjacent stations

History
Yakeishi Station opened on April 14, 1929. The station was absorbed into the JR Central network upon the privatization of Japanese National Railways (JNR) on April 1, 1987. A new station building was completed in March 2015.

Surrounding area
 
Hida River
Shimohara Dam

See also

 List of Railway Stations in Japan

Railway stations in Gifu Prefecture
Takayama Main Line
Railway stations in Japan opened in 1929
Stations of Central Japan Railway Company